"LaLaLa" is a song by South African DJ Black Coffee and American singer Usher. It is the first collaboration between the two. In 2018, they appeared together for the first time at the Global Citizen Festival.

Black Coffee had briefly published segments of the song in December 2018 on his Instagram page.

Commercial performance

The song was released on September 10, 2019, and peaked at number one on the South Africa Airplay Charts Radio Monitor chart. It is Usher's first number one in South Africa.

Chart performance

References

Usher (musician) songs
2019 singles
2019 songs
Songs written by Usher (musician)
Black-and-white music videos